Homewise (US) is a non-profit organization headquartered in Santa Fe, New Mexico that aims to help moderate income residents purchase homes. Homewise (UK) is a real estate service aimed at over-60's and does not share a connection with its US counterpart.

History

US Homewise 
The group was founded in 1986 under the name Neighborhood Housing Services of Santa Fe. The organization originally focused on home improvement and rehabilitation, but after Michael Loftin became the executive director in 1992, they branched out to cover all aspects of home ownership.

In 2012, Homewise opened an additional branch in  Albuquerque, NM. They have also consulted with similar agency in other cities such as Portland, Oregon and Charlotte, North Carolina.

UK Homewise 
Homewise began back in 1971 when founder Reg Neal noticed that many of his friends and colleagues were unable to find suitable housing for their retirement. Accommodation was either too big, too small, in the wrong location or required too much upkeep. There were very few options available to people over the age of 60 who wanted a comfortable home to call their own.

Activities
Homewise runs classes for those hoping to purchase and finance homes, provides lending services, and has both real estate agents and brokers.

Homewise UK offers a home-for-life plan as their main product.

Funding
Homewise is funded in part by grants from national and local organizations, including the Ford Foundation, the John D. and Catherine T. MacArthur Foundation, Calvert Foundation, Los Alamos National Laboratory Foundation, McCune Charitable Foundation, NeighborWorks America, Domanica Foundation, the Wachovia Foundation and the United States Department of Housing and Urban Development.

References

External links
  (U.S.)
  (U.K.)

Non-profit organizations based in New Mexico